Todalen is a village on the north shore of the Vinjefjorden in Aure Municipality in Møre og Romsdal county, Norway. Until the beginning of the 19th century, it was a municipal center with a lensmann and council. Todal had a post office until 1956, a steamboat connection to the town of Kristiansund and primary school until 1968. It is now best known for its festival, Rock mot ras, based on an idea by Kristian Todal.

References

Aure, Norway
Villages in Møre og Romsdal